Mountaineering is quite popular in India, since the entire northern and north-eastern borders are the Himalayas, the highest mountain range in the world. The apex body in India is the Indian Mountaineering Foundation, which is affiliated to the International Federation of Sport Climbing.

India has several premier mountaineering institutes. The four National Institutes are :

 Himalayan Mountaineering Institute, Darjeeling
 Nehru Institute of Mountaineering, Uttarkashi
 Jawahar Institute of Mountaineering and Winter Sports, Pahalgam
 National Institute of Mountaineering and Allied Sports (NIMAS), Dirang, Arunachal Pradesh
 Sonam Gyatso Mountaineering Institute, Gangtok
The other institutes are : 
 Atal Bihari Vajpayee Institute of Mountaineering and Allied Sports (ABVIMAS), Manali
Indian Institute of Skiing and Mountaineering, Gulmarg
 Swami Vivekanand Institute of Mountaineering, Mount Abu
 Guardian Giripremi Institute of Mountaineering (GGIM), Pune, Maharashtra

Indian mountaineers

 Ashish Mane
 Krushnaa Patil
 Asim Mukhopadhyay
 Mohan Singh Kohli
 Narendra Dhar Jayal
 Mandip Singh Soin
 Gurdial Singh
Dawa Thondup
 Narendra Kumar
 Sudipta Sengupta
 Bachendri Pal
 Kuntal Joisher
 Nirupama Pandey
 Jaahnavi Sriperambuduru
 Malavath Purna
 Chandra Prakash Vohra
 Sonam Gyatso
Mohan Singh Gunjyal
Santosh Yadav
 Colonel Ajay Kothiyal
 Colonel Saurabh Singh Shekhawat
 Lt. Colonel Ranveer Jamwal
Malli Mastan Babu

Role of The Doon School

The faculty and students of The Doon School, a boys-only boarding school in Dehradun founded in 1935, are credited to be among the early pioneers of mountaineering in a newly independent India. The founding headmaster and teachers, including A.E. Foot, R.L. Holdsworth, J.A.K. Martyn and Jack Gibson, were all Alpinists. Along with Gurdial Singh, who joined as faculty, and Narendra Dhar Jayal, then a student at Doon, they were among the first to go on major Himalayan expeditions 1940s onwards. Jayal later went on to pioneer Indian mountaineering and, at Jawaharlal Nehru's behest, became the founder principal of the Himalayan Mountaineering Institute.

See also
 Indian summiters of Mount Everest - Year wise
 Himalayas

References

External links

Institute of Mountaineering